was the central government office of a county under the Ritsuryo system of ancient Japan. It was responsible for local control and administration, and was placed under the national government. Small administrative units analogous to counties were called . The official in charge of a Gunga was known as a gunji, and the county was typically controlled by 2 to 8 appointed county governors. These governors were appointed by powerful local clans and were responsible for tasks such as tax collection. The Niihari Gunga ruins are notable ruins of a Gunga. Shida Gunga ruins is another such example.

The Ritsuryo system was enforced in the 640s, and in 701, the Taiho Code was established which changed the council system to a county system. Remains of Gunga offices have been discovered in various locations, including Niihari County in Hitachi Province, Nasu County in Shimotsuke Province, and Tamana County in Higo Province.

The Gunga also had a kitchen to prepare food for the officials and visitors. The term Gunga is also known as Gunke or Kokuga. It is similar to a modern-day city hall and was responsible for controlling the county during the Ritsuryo era.

See Also 

 Niihari Gunga ruins
 Shida Gunga ruins

References 

7th century in Japan
Government of Japan
City and town halls in Japan